Stanisław Andrzej Terlecki (13 November 1955  – 28 December 2017) was a Polish footballer. He played a total of 29 games for Poland, scoring 7 goals.

See also 
 Okęcie Airport incident

References

External links 
 NASL career stats
 

1955 births
2017 deaths
San Jose Earthquakes (1974–1988) players
ŁKS Łódź players
Legia Warsaw players
Major Indoor Soccer League (1978–1992) players
North American Soccer League (1968–1984) players
North American Soccer League (1968–1984) indoor players
New York Cosmos players
Pittsburgh Spirit players
Polish expatriate footballers
Polish footballers
Poland international footballers
Polonia Warsaw players
Footballers from Warsaw
Gwardia Warsaw players
Expatriate soccer players in the United States
Association football midfielders
Association football forwards
Polish expatriate sportspeople in the United States